Arno is both a surname and a Germanic given name (Germanic root "arn-" from "aran", meaning "eagle"). Notable people with the name include:

People with the given name
Arno of Salzburg (–821), Archbishop of Salzburg also known as Arn or Aquila
Arno von Endsee (died 892), Bishop of Würzburg

Academics
Arno Gruen (1923–2015), Swiss-German psychologist and psychoanalyst
Arno Kuijlaars (born 1963), Dutch mathematician
Arno Lustiger (1924–2012), German historian and author 
Arno J. Mayer (born 1926), Luxembourg-born American historian
Arno Motulsky (1923–2018), German-born American pharmacologist and genomicist
Arno Allan Penzias (born 1933), German-born American physicist, radio astronomer and Nobel laureate
Arno Peters (1916–2002), German historian, known for the Peters world map 
Arno Poebel (1881–1958), German Assyriologist
Arno Schirokauer (1899–1954), German-Jewish literary scholar
Arno Ros (born 1942), German philosopher
Arno Villringer (born 1958), German neurologist
Arno Arthur Wachmann (1902–1990), German astronomer

Arts
Arno (singer) (1949–2022), stage name of Belgian singer Arno Hintjens
Arno Assmann (1908–1979), German actor, film director and television writer
Arno Babajanian (1921–1983), Armenian composer and pianist
Arno Bornkamp (born 1959), Dutch classical saxophonist
Arno Camenisch (born 1978), Swiss writer
Arno Breker (1900–1991), German sculptor
Arno Carstens (born 1972), South African singer-songwriter
Arno Cost (born 1986), stage name of Vadim Arnaud Constentin, French musician, DJ and producer
Arno Fischer (1927–2011), German photographer
Arno Frey (1900–1961), German actor in Hollywood
Arno Frisch (born 1975), Austrian actor
Arno Gasteiger (born 1962), Austrian-born New Zealand photographer
Arno Geiger (born 1968), Austrian novelist
Arno Holz (1863–1929), German naturalist poet and dramatist
Arno Jordaan, South African pop singer
Arno Karlen (1937–2010), American poet, psychoanalyst, and popular science writer
Arno Marsh (1928–2019), American jazz saxophonist
Arno Menses, Dutch rock singer and guitarist
Arno Rafael Minkkinen (born 1945), Finnish photographer in the US
Arno Mohr (1910–2001), German painter and graphic artist
Arno Morales (born 1993), Filipino actor
Arno Nadel (1878–1943), Jewish musicologist, composer, playwright, poet, and painter
Arno Paduch, German cornett player and conductor
Arno Paulsen (1900–1969), German film actor
Arno Rink (1940–2017), German painter
Arno Santamaria (born 1978), French singer-songwriter
Arno Schmidt (1914–1979), German author and translator
Arno Suislep (born 1981), Estonian singer
Arno Surminski (born 1934), German writer
Arno Suurorg (1903–1960), Estonian actor

Government, military, and religion
Arno Anthoni (1900–1961), Finnish lawyer, director of the State Police 
Arno Doerksen (born 1958), Canadian politician
Arno Esch (1928–1951), German liberal politician in the Soviet Occupation Zone
Arno C. Gaebelein (1861–1945), American Methodist minister 
Arno Jahr (1890–1943), German Wehrmacht general
Arno Kompatscher (born 1971), president of South Tyrol
Arno Lamoer, South African police commissioner
Arno von Lenski (1893–1986), German general and East German politician
Arno H. Luehman (1911–1989), United States Air Force general
Arno Rutte (born 1972), Dutch VVD politician
Arno Sild (born 1947), Estonian politician
Arno Voss (1821–1888), German-American military commander, lawyer, and politician

Sports
Arno Almqvist (1881–1940), Finnish colonel and modern pentathlete
Arno Bertogna (born 1959), Australian association football player
Arno Bieberstein (1884–1918), German swimmer
Arno Botha (born 1991), South African rugby player
Arno Breitmeyer (1903–1944), German sport official
Arno Claeys (born 1994), Belgian footballer
Arno del Curto (born 1956), Swiss ice hockey player and coach
Arno Ehret (born 1953), West German handball player
Arno Glockauer (1888–1966), German gymnast 
Arno den Hartog (born 1954), Dutch field hockey player
Arno Havenga (born 1974), Dutch water polo player
Arno Hesse (1887–?), German middle-distance runner
Arno Jacobs (born 1977), South African cricketer
Arno Klaassen (born 1979), Dutch bobsledder
Arno Klasen (born 1967), German racecar driver
Arno Kozelsky (born 1981), Austrian footballer
Arno Neumann (1885–1966), German footballer
Arno Pijpers (born 1959), Dutch football coach
Arno Poley (born 1991), South African rugby player
Arno Rossini (born 1957), Swiss football manager
Arno Saarinen (1884–1970), Finnish gymnast
Arno Steffenhagen (born 1949), German footballer
Arno Strohmeyer (born 1963), Austrian fencer
Arno Van de Velde (born 1995), Belgian volleyball player
Arno van Wyk (born 1994), South African rugby player
Arno Verschueren (born 1997), Belgian footballer
Arno Wohlfahrter (born 1964), Austrian cyclist
Arno Wallaard (1979–2006), Dutch cyclist
Arno van Zwam (born 1969), Dutch footballer
Arno van der Zwet (born 1986), Dutch track cyclist

Other people
Arno Benzler, German World War I flying ace
Arno Berg (1890– 1974), Swedish-Norwegian architect and antiquarian
Arno B. Cammerer (1883–1941), American director of the U.S. National Park Service
Arno H. Denecke (1916–1993), American jurist
Arno Funke (born 1950), German extortionist
Arno Kopecky, Canadian journalist and travel writer
Arno Nickel (born 1952), German correspondence chess Grandmaster
Arno Schmidt (born ), Austrian chef and food critic
Arno Zude (born 1964), German chess master and problemist

Fictional characters with the given name
 , titular character in a comic strip by André Juillard and Jacques Martin
Arno, a character in the movie Uncut Gems
 Arno Blunt, antagonist in the book Artemis Fowl: The Eternity Code.
 Arno Brandner, fictional character on German soap opera Verbotene Liebe (Forbidden Love)
 Arno Victor Dorian, a French-Austrian Assassin and the protagonist of Assassin's Creed Unity.
 Arno Stark, Marvel Comics character known as Iron Man 2020
 Arno, a character in Logical Journey of the Zoombinis.

People with the surname
Alice Arno, stage name of Marie-France Broquet (born 1946), French actress and model
Audrey Arno (1942–2012), German singer and actress
Bob Arno. Swedish-born American pickpocket entertainer and criminologist
Christian Arno (born 1978), British businessman
Diana Arno (born 1984), Estonian model and fashion designer 
Ed Arno (1916–2008), American cartoonist
Ferdinando Arnò (born 1959), Italian composer, record producer, and arranger
Madame Arno, Parisian artist and fighter
Nelly Arno (1892–1966), British actress
Peter Arno (1904–1968), American cartoonist
Sig Arno (1895–1975), German-Jewish film actor

See also
Arno (disambiguation)
Arno, Italian river

German masculine given names
Dutch masculine given names
Estonian masculine given names
Finnish masculine given names